Ramūnas Radavičius (born 20 January 1981) is a Lithuanian former international footballer who played as a midfielder.

Career
Radavičius has played club football for FC Vilnius, FK Žalgiris Vilnius, FK Sūduva Marijampolė and FK Ekranas.

He made his international debut for Lithuania in 2010.

References

1981 births
Living people
Lithuanian footballers
Lithuania international footballers
FK Žalgiris players
FC Šiauliai players
Association football midfielders